High diving at the 2017 World Aquatics Championships was held between 28 and 30 July 2017 in Budapest, Hungary.

Schedule
Two events will be held.

All time are local (UTC+2).

Medal summary

Medal table

Medal events

References

External links
Official website

 
High diving
2017
High diving at the World Aquatics Championships